In the 1999 Tour de France, the following 20 teams were each allowed to field nine cyclists:

After the doping controversies in the 1998 Tour de France, the Tour organisation banned some persons from the race, including cyclist Richard Virenque, Laurent Roux and Philippe Gaumont, manager Manolo Saiz and the entire  team. Virenque's team Polti then appealed at the UCI against this decision, and the UCI then forced the Tour organisation to allow Virenque and Saiz entry in the Tour.

Teams

Qualified teams

Invited teams

Cyclists

By starting number

By team

By nationality

References

1999 Tour de France
1999